Joseph Augustine Fitzmyer  (November 4, 1920 – December 24, 2016) was an American Catholic priest and scholar who taught at several American and British universities  He was a member of the Society of Jesus (Jesuits).

Fitzmyer was considered an important scholar of biblical studies, particularly the New Testament.  He also contributed to the study of the Dead Sea Scrolls and early Jewish literature.

Biography

Early life 
Joseph Fitzmyer was born on November 4, 1920, in Philadelphia, Pennsylvania.  He was  admitted on July 30, 1938 to the novitiate of the Maryland Province of the Society of Jesus in Wernersville, Pennsylvania. In 1940, he entered Loyola University Chicago, earning a Bachelor of Arts degree and in 1945 a Master of Arts degree in Greek language. Fitzmyer then studied theology in the Facultés Saint-Albert in Belgium.

Priesthood 
Fitzmyer was ordained into the priesthood on August 15, 1951.  He was granted a Licentiate of Sacred Theology by the  Catholic University of Leuven in Leuven, Belgium, in 1952 and a Doctor of Semitics degree from Johns Hopkins University in Baltimore, Maryland in 1956.  He completed his education with a Licentiate of Sacred Scripture from the Pontifical Biblical Institute in Rome in 1957. He then received a fellowship at the American School of Oriental Research (ASOR) in Jerusalem.  He worked on preparing a concordance to the Dead Sea Scrolls.

Career 
From 1958 to 1969, Fitzmyer taught New Testament and biblical languages at Woodstock College in Woodstock, Maryland. He moved to Chicago in 1969 to teach  Aramaic and Hebrew at the University of Chicago.  In 1971, Fitzmyer joined the faculty of Fordham University to teach New Testament and biblical languages.  He then went to the Weston School of Theology at Boston College in Boston, Massachusetts.  

Fitzmyer served as the speaker's lecturer at the University of Oxford in the United Kingdom from 1974 to 1975.  In 1976, Fitzmyer was appointed as a professor of New Testament in the Department of Biblical Studies at the Catholic University of America in Washington, D.C. Fitzmyer joined the Jesuit community at Georgetown University in Washington.    

Fitzmyer served as editor of The Catholic Biblical Quarterly, The Journal of Biblical Literature and New Testament Studies.  He was president of the Catholic Biblical Association of America (1969–1970), of the Society of Biblical Literature (1979), and of the Studiorum Novi Testamenti Societas (1992–1993).  He was the 1984 recipient of the Burkitt Medal of the British Academy and was a member of the Pontifical Biblical Commission from 1984 to 1995.

Retirement, death and legacy 
In 1986, Fitzmyer retired from Catholic University, but did not go into full retirement until 2011.  Joseph Fitzmyer died in Merion, Pennsylvania, on December 24, 2016.

John Martens spoke of Fitzmyer to America as: “...a giant of biblical scholarship. No qualifiers need apply. He was not a giant of Catholic biblical scholarship, not a giant of 20th-century biblical scholarship, just a giant of biblical scholarship.”His funeral was held on 5 January 2017 at St. Matthias Church in Bala Cynwyd, Pennsylvania and he was subsequently buried in the cemetery of the Jesuit Center in Wernersville, Pennsylvania.

Biblical commentaries
Fitzmyer's publications covered Scripture, theology, Christology, catechesis, and the Dead Sea Scrolls.  He was a co-editor of the Jerome Biblical Commentary (1968) and the New Jerome Biblical Commentary (1991)

The New Jerome Biblical Commentary (1989) This includes articles introducing the New Testament Epistles, Epistle to the Galatians, Romans, Philemon and on the history of Israel as well as Paul the Apostle and Pauline theology. In the last one, after a historical review of 40 themes, Fitzmyer concludes:As Christ was "the image of the God" (2 Cor 4:4) so human beings are destined to be "the image of the heavenly man" (1 Cor 15:49; cf. Rom 8:29). [Through] growth in Christ ... the Christian lives his or her life "for God" (Gal 2:19). Thus, for all his emphasis on Christ, Paul once again refers Christian existence ultimately to the Father – through Christ.Anchor Bible Commentary (1993). It contains the Spiritual Exercises Based on Paul's Epistle to the Romans, which links biblical commentary and exegeses with modern spirituality. In it, Fitzmyer lays out his interpretation of Romans in a more condensed form. Using historical and rhetorical criticism, Paul's Jewish background and Graeco-Roman setting, Fitzmyer sees coherency in Paul's message. While some scholars argue that Paul's theology is largely dependent on its context, such as the crisis in the Corinthian community, Fitzmyer argues for a vital application of Romans to modern situations. It also includes work on The Gospel of Luke (in two volumes), Acts of the Apostles, 1 Corinthians, Romans, and Philemon. 

The Impact of the Dead Sea Scrolls.  Fitzmyer summarizes his 50 years of research in the field.

Selected works

Books
  See "The Biblical Commission's Instruction" below for earliest publication in English.

Articles and chapters

Festschrift
 M. P. Horgan and P. J. Kobelski, To Touch the Text: Biblical and Related Studies in Honor of Joseph A. Fitzmyer, S.J. New York: Crossroad, 1989.

References

1920 births
2016 deaths
Clergy from Philadelphia
20th-century American Jesuits
21st-century American Jesuits
Loyola University Chicago alumni
Catholic University of Leuven (1834–1968) alumni
Johns Hopkins University alumni
Pontifical Biblical Institute alumni
American Roman Catholic religious writers
American biblical scholars
Roman Catholic biblical scholars
New Testament scholars
Jesuit theologians
Christologists
Dead Sea Scrolls
Contributors to the Anchor Bible Series
University of Chicago faculty
Fordham University faculty
Catholic University of America School of Theology and Religious Studies faculty